Beth David Cemetery is a Jewish cemetery located at 300 Elmont Road in Elmont, New York. The cemetery was established in 1917. As of 2012, there were approximately 245,000 burials in the cemetery.

Notable interments
Sam Ash (1897–1956), violinist
Eduard Bloch (1872–1945), personal physician to the family of Adolf Hitler
Rube Bloom (1902–1976), musician
Dori Brenner (1946–2000), actress
Joseph Brody (1877–1937), composer
Joyce Brothers (1927–2013), psychologist
Barbara Craddock (1940–2005), dancer and choreographer
Happy Foreman (1899–1953), baseball player
Noah Greenberg (1919–1966), conductor
Bernard Herrmann (1911–1975), composer
Israel J. Hochman (1875–1940), bandleader and music arranger
Sol Kaplan (1919–1990), composer
Andy Kaufman (1949–1984), comedian and actor
Martin Landau (1928–2017), actor
Jay Larkin (1950–2010), television executive
Sam Levenson (1911–1980), humorist
Barry Lewis (1945–2021), historian
Chuck Low (1928–2017), actor
Sidney Lumet (1924–2011), film director
Jackie Mason (1928–2021), comedian and actor
Jack Newfield (1938–2004), journalist
Mitchell Parish (1900–1993), lyricist
Robert Plotnik (1943-2018), owner of "Bleecker Bob's" record shop 
Doc Pomus (1925–1991), musician
Mnachem Risikoff (1866–1960), rabbi and scholar
Saul Rogovin (1923–1995), baseball player
Elyakim Rosenblatt (1933–2019), Orthodox rabbi
Benjamin Stanley Rosenthal (1923–1983), politician
Walt Singer (1911–1992), football player
Harry Strauss (1909–1941), mobster
Herbert Tenzer (1905–1993), politician
Abe Vigoda (1921–2016), actor
Leibele Waldman (1907–1969), composer and actor
Herman Wouk (1915–2019), author

References

1917 establishments in New York (state)
Cemeteries in Nassau County, New York
Jewish cemeteries in New York (state)
Jews and Judaism in Suffolk County, New York